is a passenger railway station located in Higashinada-ku, Kobe, Hyōgo Prefecture, Japan. It is operated by the private transportation company Hankyu Railway.

Lines

Layout
The station has two side platforms serving two tracks. The south ticket gate is underground and connected with each platform by each stairs and each elevator. The north gate is accessible and is directly connected to the east-bound platform. West of the station is a short siding between the two tracks for train up to six cars. Presently it is regularly used by out-of-service trains (forwarding of additional cars for peak hours).

Platforms

History
Mikage Station opened on 16 July 1920, simultaneously with the opening of the Kobe Main Line.

The pocket track west of the station was completed in 1968.

The station was damaged by the Great Hanshin earthquake in January 1995. Restoration work on the Kobe Line took 7 months to complete.

Station numbering was introduced on 21 December 2013, with Mikage being designated as station number HK-12.

Passenger statistics
In fiscal 2019, the station was used by an average of 10,350 passengers daily

Surrounding area 
North of the station features a beautiful lake (Fukadaike Park) a book shop and a bakery.
There were and are magnificent mansions such as former Kodera house, the one built by the founding family of Takeda Pharmaceutical Company and so on.

Fukadaike Park（深田池公園）
Hakutsuru Fine Art Museum（白鶴美術館）
KOSETSU Museum of Art（香雪美術館）
Yuzuruha Shrine (5 minutes walk south, 弓弦羽神社)

Bus transport 
In front of the station is a bus that goes to Rokko Island (220 Yen)

Route 19 of Kobe City Bus
for Mikage Station (Hanshin) is available from here. (Adults: 210 Yen, Children: 110 Yen)

See also
List of railway stations in Japan

References

External links

 Mikage Station website 

Railway stations in Japan opened in 1920
Railway stations in Kobe
Hankyū Kōbe Main Line